United States Coast Guard officer rank insignia describes an officer's pay-grade. Rank is displayed on collar devices, shoulder boards, and on the sleeves of dress uniforms.

Commissioned officer ranks
Commissioned officers in the Coast Guard are line officers, unlike the Navy, which has a staff corps to identify certain career fields. Coast Guard officers hold pay grades ranging from O-1 to O-10 and have the same rank structure as the Navy. Officers holding the rank of ensign (O-1) through lieutenant commander (O-4) are considered junior officers, commanders (O-5) and captains (O-6) are considered senior officers, and rear admirals (O-7) through admirals (O-10) are considered flag officers. The Commandant of the Coast Guard and the Vice Commandant of the Coast Guard are the only members of the Coast Guard authorized to hold the rank of admiral.

The Coast Guard does not have medical officers or chaplains of its own. Instead, chaplains from the U.S. Navy, as well as officers from the U.S. Public Health Service Commissioned Corps are assigned to the Coast Guard to perform chaplain-related functions and medical-related functions, respectively. These officers wear Coast Guard uniforms but replace the Coast Guard insignia with that of their own service.

The Navy and Coast Guard share identical officer rank insignia except that Coast Guard officers wear a gold Coast Guard Shield in lieu of a line star or staff corps officer insignia.

Warrant officer ranks 

Highly qualified enlisted personnel in pay grades E-6 through E-9 with a minimum of eight years' experience can compete each year for appointment as warrant officers (WO). Successful candidates are chosen by a board and then commissioned as chief warrant officer two (CWO2) in one of twenty-one specialties. Over time, chief warrant officers may be promoted to chief warrant officer three (CWO3) and chief warrant officer four (CWO4). The ranks of warrant officer (WO1) and chief warrant officer five (CWO5) are not currently used in the Coast Guard. Chief warrant officers may also compete for the Chief Warrant Officer to Lieutenant Program. If selected, the warrant officer will be promoted to lieutenant (O-3E). The "E" designates over four years' active duty service as a warrant officer or enlisted member and entitles the member to a higher rate of pay than other lieutenants.

United States Coast Guard Auxiliary
The United States Coast Guard Auxiliary is the uniformed auxiliary service of the Coast Guard.  The Auxiliary does not use the Coast Guard rank system but does use modified Coast Guard officer rank insignia to signify a member's position within the organization.  For example, a Flotilla Commander wears insignia similar to a Lieutenant.

USCG Auxiliary officers wear silver braid insignia (referred to as "office insignia") instead of gold; with a "hollow" USCG shield above containing the letters "USCG" superimposed above a red "A" (to signify an appointed officer in an administrative position) or silver "A" (to signify an elected officer in a leadership position).  Metal and sew-on insignia are identical to Coast Guard officer insignia, except that a red, blue, or black "A" is superimposed.

Auxiliarists generally do not use titles in direct address, with the exception of a few very senior leaders who are addressed as "Commodore."

See also
 List of United States Coast Guard enlisted rates
 Revenue Cutter Service officer ranks — the preceding agency to the USCG.
 Naval officer ranks — comparison to other countries and explanation of NATO rank codes

References

External links
Department of Defense Rank Insignias — Officers Rank

Rate
Military insignia